The Ognevoy-class destroyers consisted of 26 destroyers built for the Soviet Navy during and immediately after World War II. The official Soviet designation was Project 30 and Project 30K. Construction was disrupted by the invasion of the Soviet Union in 1941 (Operation Barbarossa) and many ships were cancelled or scrapped. Only a single ship was completed during the war and the other 10 were finished in 1947–1950.

The Type 7 destroyers proved to have a less than adequate seaworthiness for Soviet conditions. The Soviets decided to build a larger ship with main armament in enclosed turrets. These ships proved popular with the Soviet Navy and formed the basis for the post-war  or Project 30bis.

Design

The specification (TTZ in Russian) for these ships was issued by the Naval staff in November 1937. The design work was done by Zhdanov Yard in Leningrad under the leadership of A. Yunovidova and approved by the government in 1939.

Hull strength was significantly increased and the hull was enlarged compared to the Project 7 ships. Longitudinal framing was used and hull plating was thicker than the Project 7 ships. Hull height was increased giving extra free board.

The machinery consisted of two boiler rooms and two engine rooms similar to the Project 7U destroyers but in less cramped spaces. Electricity generation capacity was increased to two  plants and two  plants. An alternative design Project 30A using super-heated high pressure machinery based on American designs was projected but not built.

The armament was housed in two enclosed splinter-proof and weatherproof turrets in 'A' and 'Y' positions. This was a significant advance over the open mountings used in the Project 7 ships. Anti-aircraft armament comprised two  guns in a twin mounting in 'X' position and six  guns in single mountings. The ships also carried two sets of quadruple torpedo tubes and 50 mines.

The ships were fitted with air warning, surface search and gunnery control radars and sonar after the war.

Ships 
24 ships were ordered in 1938–1940 but the programme was disrupted by the German invasion in 1941. The ships being built in Nikolayev were demolished before launch or evacuated incomplete while those built in other yards were suspended for the duration of the conflict. Some of the intact ships were completed after the war to a modified design (K for korrektirovany – corrected).

Service history
Ognevoys hull was towed to Poti, Georgia; her turrets were salvaged from the wreck of the destroyer .

References

Citations

Sources

 

 

Destroyer classes
Destroyers of the Soviet Navy
World War II destroyers of the Soviet Union
Cold War destroyers of the Soviet Union